The Rosario class was a class of seven screw-sloops of wooden construction built for the Royal Navy between 1860 and 1862. A further six vessels were ordered and laid down, but were cancelled in 1863 before launch. This was the last class of purely wooden sloops built for the Royal Navy.

Design
The Rosario class were designed in 1858 by Issac Watts, the Director of Naval Construction. They were built of wood, were rated for 11 guns and were built with a full ship rig of sails (this was reduced to a barque rig by about 1869). These were the last sloops constructed for the Royal Navy to retain all-wooden construction; their successors, the Amazon class, incorporated iron cross beams.

Propulsion
All the completed vessels, with the exception of Shearwater, were fitted with a Greenock Foundry Company two-cylinder horizontal single-expansion steam engine driving a single screw. Shearwaters R & W Hawthorn engine was similar in design and power.

Armament
As designed, ships of the class carried a single slide-mounted 40-pounder Armstrong breech-loading gun, six 32-pounder muzzle-loading smooth-bore guns and four pivot-mounted 20-pounder Armstrong breech loaders.  By 1869 the armament had been reduced to a single  muzzle-loading gun and two 40-pounders.

Operational lives

Rosario

Rosario served a four-year commission on the North America and West Indies Station and then served an eight-year commission in Australia.  She paid off in Sheerness in 1875 and was broken up nearly ten years later.

Peterel

Peterel served three commissions as a warship, on the North America and West Indies Station, the Cape of Good Hope Station and the Pacific Station. In 1877 she became a lightship marking the wreck of Vanguard, then in 1885 she was converted into a coal depot before finally being sold in 1901, the longest lived of her class.

Rapid

Rapid served a commission on the Cape of Good Hope Station and then two commissions with the  Mediterranean Fleet before being broken up at Malta after more than 20 years service.

Shearwater

Shearwater spent a single six-year commission on the Pacific Station and was then converted into a survey vessel.  Under George Strong Nares and later William Wharton (later Hydrographer of the Navy) she surveyed around the Mediterranean and the East coast of Africa.  She was broken up at Sheerness in 1877.

Royalist
Royalist served both her commissions on the North America and West Indies Station, being commanded between 1865 and 1866 by Maurice Horatio Nelson, son of Thomas Nelson, 2nd Earl Nelson and great nephew to Horatio Nelson.  She was broken up at Chatham in 1875.

Columbine
Columbine served briefly in the Channel Squadron before moving to the Pacific Station.  Her second commission was on the East Indies Station, which at the time was involved in a long campaign to combat slavery in the area.  Like Royalist, she was broken up at Chatham in 1875.

Africa

Of all the class, Africa had by far the shortest career in the Royal Navy, but one of the most unusual.  Sold to the Imperial Chinese Customs shortly after launch, and renamed China, she became part of Sherard Osborn's "Vampire Fleet", along with Jasper and Mohawk.  The venture came to nothing when it became apparent that command would not rest with the Emperor, but instead with local Mandarins. Osborn resigned his command, and the ships were resold to the Egyptian government in the mid-1860s.

Ships

References

  

 

 
Sloop classes
 Rosario